Rhagoletis cingulata, the eastern cherry fruit fly,  is a species of tephritid or fruit flies in the genus Rhagoletis of the family Tephritidae. The cherry fruit fly, Rhagoletis cingulata (Loew), is found from Michigan to New Hampshire, southward to Florida, occurring over the entire middle and eastern region of the United States and also in southeastern and southcentral Canada.

References

External links
 eastern cherry fruit fly on the UF / IFAS Featured Creatures Web site

cingulata